O Hyok-chol (born 2 August 1991) is a North Korean professional footballer who plays as a right midfielder.

International goals
.Scores and results are list North Korea's goal tally first.

External links 
 
O Hyok-chol at DPRKFootball

1991 births
Living people
North Korean footballers
North Korea international footballers
2015 AFC Asian Cup players
Association football wingers
April 25 Sports Club players